The Khatu Shyam Temple (Hindi: खाटू श्याम मंदिर) is a Hindu temple in Khatoo village of Sikar district in Rajasthan, India. It is a pilgrimage site for worshipping the deity Krishna and Barbarika who is often venerated as a Kuladevata. Devotees believe the temple houses the head of Barbarika or Khatushyam, a legendary warrior who sacrifices his head upon the request of Krishna during the antebellum of the Kurukshetra War.

Story

Before the beginning of the Mahābhārata battle, Barbarika's last wish was to see the war "Mahabharat" so Lord krishna himself placed his head on the top of a mountain for Barbarika to see the war. Many years after Kali Yuga started, the head was found buried in the village of Khatoo (Sikar district) in present-day Rajasthan. The location was obscured until well after the Kali Yuga period began. Then, on one occasion, milk started flowing spontaneously out of a cow's udder when she neared the burial spot. Amazed at this incident, the local villagers dug the place up and the buried head was revealed. The head was handed over to a Brahmin who worshipped it for many days, awaiting divine revelations as to what was to be done next. Roopsingh Chauhan, king of Khatu, then had a dream where he was inspired to build a temple and install the head therein. Subsequently, a temple was built and the idol was installed on the 11th day of the Shukla Paksha (bright half) of the month of Phalgun.

There is another, only slightly different version of this legend. Roopsingh Chauhan was the ruler of Khatu. His wife, Narmada Kanwar, once had a dream in which the deity instructed her to take his image out of the earth. The indicated place (now known as Shyam Kund) was then dug up. Sure enough, it yielded the idol, which was duly enshrined in the temple.

The original temple was built in 1027 AD by Roopsingh Chauhan, after his wife Narmada Kanwar, saw dream about the buried idol. The place where the idol was dug out from is called Shyam Kund. In 1720 AD, a nobleman known as Diwan Abhaisingh renovated the old temple, at the behest of the then ruler of Marwar. The temple took its present shape at this time and the idol was enshrined in the sanctum sanctorum. The idol is made of rare stone. Khatushyam is the family deity of many families.

Another temple is located at Lambha, Ahmedabad, Gujarat. People bring their newly born children to have blessings of Khatushyam. Here he is known as Baliya Dev.

Architectural features
The temple is architecturally rich. Lime mortar, marble and tiles have been used in constructing the structure. The shutters of the sanctum sanctorum are covered with gold sheet. Outside is the prayer hall, named Jagmohan. The hall is large in size (measuring 12.3 m x 4.7 m) and its walls are elaborately painted, depicting mythological scenes. The entrance gate and exit gate are made of marble; their brackets are also of marble and feature ornamental floral designs.

Precincts

There is an open space in front of the entrance gate of the temple. The Shyam Bagicha is a garden near the temple from where picked flowers are to be offered to the deity. The Samadhi of Aloo Singh, a great devotee, is located within the garden.

The "Shyam Kund" is a holy pond near the temple from where the 'Sheesh' of baba shyam came out. In this kund devotees take bath and do worship of khatu naresh.

The Gopinath temple lies to the south-east of the main temple. The Gaurishankar temple also lies nearby. There is an interesting tale associated with the Gaurishankar temple. It is said that some soldiers of the Mughal emperor Aurangzeb wanted to destroy this temple. They attacked the Shiva lingam enshrined within this temple with their spears. Immediately, fountains of blood appeared from the Shiva Lingam. The soldiers ran away, terrified. One can still see the mark of the spear on the Lingam.

Khatushyam main temple is located at Khatu Town about 80 km from Jaipur. Devotees are requested to take route via Reengus.

Administration and amenities

The Public Trust that has charge of the temple is registered under registration No. 3/86. A 7-member committee oversees the management of the temple. Shyam Mandir Committee manages and organizes the festivals and other important events every year in the village. The major festival for which the trust is the most responsible body to organize the event is Fagotsava Mela. Involvement in the Prasad preparation, barricading, cleanliness, temporary arrangements, water facilities, electricity supply, arrangements of generators, decorations, sound system, preparation of barriers, video coverage, closed circuit T.V., etc. is being done by the trust.  A number of Dharmashalas (charity lodges) are available for their comfortable stay. The temple timings are as follows:
In winter (Ashvin bahula 1st to Chaitra shuddha 15th): 5.30 am - 1.00 pm and 4.00 pm - 9.00 pm.
In summer (Vaishakha bahula 1st to Bhadrapada shuddha 15th): 4.30 am - 12.30 pm and 4.00 pm - 10.00 pm.
The temple is closed at 11ras and Sunday. The temple is also open throughout the 4-day Phalgun Mela.

See also
 Khatu
 Iravat

References

External links

Hindu temples in Rajasthan
Tourist attractions in Sikar district